The 1926 Kansas gubernatorial election was held on November 2, 1926. Incumbent Republican Benjamin S. Paulen defeated Democratic nominee Jonathan M. Davis with 63.31% of the vote.

General election

Candidates
Major party candidates 
Benjamin S. Paulen, Republican
Jonathan M. Davis, Democratic

Other candidates
H. Hilfrich, Socialist

Results

References

1926
Kansas
Gubernatorial